Kürd Mahruzlu (also Kurd Mahruzlu) is a village in the Qubadli District of Azerbaijan.

History 
The village was located in the Armenian-occupied territories surrounding Nagorno-Karabakh, coming under the control of ethnic Armenian forces in 1993 during the First Nagorno-Karabakh War. The village subsequently became part of the breakaway Republic of Artsakh as part of its Kashatagh Province, referred to as Artsvashen. It was recaptured by Azerbaijan on 23 October 2020 during the 2020 Nagorno-Karabakh war.

Gallery

References

External links 

 

Populated places in Qubadli District